Trouble is the debut Japanese studio album (second overall) by South Korean girl group EXID. It was released on April 3, 2019, by Tokuma Japan Communications.

Release 
The album was released in two physical editions, including a regular and a limited edition, and as a digital download on April 3, 2019.

Commercial performance 
Trouble debuted and peaked at number 12 on the Oricon Albums Chart and at number 23 on Billboard Japans Hot Albums. It also peaked at number 10 on Billboard Japans Top Albums Sales, with 4,831 physical copies sold in its first week.

Track listing

Charts

References 

EXID albums
Tokuma Shoten albums
2019 albums